Paraíso Bay is a group of four adjacent high-rise buildings in the Edgewater neighborhood of Miami, Florida, United States. The two additional towers are branded ONE Paraíso (53 floors, height of 601 feet) and Paraíso Bayviews (46 floors, height of 500 feet) and are standalone buildings. Collectively, the buildings contain over 1300 residential units.

A separate two-story structure is located on the water and currently houses a restaurant operated by James Beard Award-winning chef, Michael Schwartz.  The restaurant, called Amara at Paraiso, is open to the public.  The development also incorporates a bay-front park, called Paraiso Park, that includes a children's playground and fenced-in dog park.  Collectively, the residential buildings, restaurant structure and park are referred to as The Paraiso District.  

The development is located directly on the Biscayne Bay and all residential units enjoy direct views of the water.

Construction of the project started in July 2014 and was completed in 2018. Several city officials joined in the groundbreaking ceremony, including mayor Tomás Regalado. The developer, The Related Group, pledged to include a public park as part of the project due to a land swap deal that allowed them to close the end of a city street. The project was formerly approved as Element by a separate developer.

Paraíso is Spanish for paradise.

Amenities 
The development was originally marketed as having among the largest variety of resident amenities of any luxury complex throughout the world.  Residents in Paraiso Bay and Grand Paraiso share a large variety of amenities, while ONE Paraiso and Paraiso Bayviews have amenities that are dedicated to each specific building.  

Amenities include:

 Numerous swimming pools, including children's pools
 A large, circular "zero entry" pool (Paraiso Bay and Grand Paraiso)
 3+ Acres of resort decks and lounging areas
 Outdoor hot tubs
 Resident clubrooms with catering kitchens
 Billiards tables and rooms
 Business centers with private boardroom
 Cardio and weight gyms
 Spin bike studios
 Cinema room
 Cigar room with private cigar storage
 Wine tasting room with private wine storage
 Indoor hot tubs, dry saunas and steam saunas
 Massage treatment rooms
 Lighted tennis courts
 BBQ grills and outdoor party pavilions
 Business centers and board rooms
 Game room
 Children's play room
 Golf simulator room (Paraiso Bay and Grand Paraiso)
 Bowling lanes (Paraiso Bay and Grand Paraiso)
 Putting green
 Storage for bicycles, scooters and personal water equipment (e.g. stand-up paddle-boards)
 Valet parking
 Private boat dock
 Bayview park with children's playground and dog park

See also
 List of tallest buildings in Miami

References

Residential skyscrapers in Miami
2018 establishments in Florida
Residential buildings completed in 2018
Residential condominiums in Miami